Nasirabad  is a small town located in Naseerabad District in the Pakistani province of Balochistan.

Populated places in Nasirabad District